North Korea is located in East Asia in the Northern half of Korea, partially on the Korean Peninsula. It borders three countries: China along the Yalu (Amnok) River, Russia along the Tumen River, and South Korea to the south.

Topography and drainage

The terrain consists mostly of hills and mountains separated by deep, narrow valleys. The coastal plains are wide in the west and discontinuous in the east.

Early European visitors to Korea remarked that the country resembled "a sea in a heavy gale" because of the many successive mountain ranges that crisscross the peninsula. The great majority of the population lives in the plains and lowlands.

Other major ranges include the Rangrim Mountains, which are located in the north-central part of North Korea and run in a north-south direction, making communication between the eastern and western parts of the country rather difficult; and the Kangnam Range, which runs along the North Korea–China border. Kumgangsan, or Diamond Mountain, (approximately ) in the Thaebaek Range, which extends into South Korea, is famous for its scenic beauty.

For the most part, the plains are small. The most extensive are the Pyongyang and Chaeryong plains, each covering about 500 km2. Because the mountains on the east coast drop abruptly to the sea, the plains are even smaller there than on the west coast.

The mountain ranges in the northern and eastern parts of North Korea form the watershed for most of its rivers, which run in a westerly direction and empty into the Yellow Sea and Korea Bay. The longest is the Amnok River, which is navigable for 678 km of its . The Tuman River, one of the few major rivers to flow into the Sea of Japan, is the second longest at  but is navigable for only  because of the mountainous topography.

The third longest river, the Taedong River, flows through Pyongyang and is navigable for 245 of its 397 km. Lakes tend to be small because of the lack of glacial activity and the stability of the Earth's crust in the region. Unlike neighboring Japan or northern China, North Korea experiences few severe earthquakes. The country has a number of natural spas and hot springs, which number 124 according to one North Korean source.

Climate

North Korea has a combination of a continental climate and an oceanic climate, with four distinct seasons. Most of North Korea is classified as being of a humid continental climate within the Köppen climate classification scheme, with warm summers and cold, dry winters. In summer, there is a short rainy season called changma.

Long winters bring bitter cold and clear weather interspersed with snowstorms as a result of northern and northwestern winds that blow from Siberia. On average, it snows thirty-seven days during the winter. Winter can be particularly harsh in the northern, mountainous regions.

Summer tends to be short, hot, humid, and rainy because of the southern and southeastern monsoon winds that bring moist air from the Pacific Ocean. Spring and autumn are transitional seasons marked by mild temperatures and variable winds and bring the most pleasant weather.

On average, approximately 60% of all precipitation occurs from June to September. Natural hazards include late spring droughts which are often followed by severe flooding. Typhoons affect the peninsula on an average of at least once every summer or early autumn. The drought that started in June 2015, according to the Korean Central News Agency, has been the worst seen in 100 years.

Examples

Climate change

Environment

The environment of North Korea is diverse, encompassing alpine, forest, farmland, freshwater, and marine ecosystems.

In recent years, the environment has been reported to be in a state of "crisis", "catastrophe", or "collapse".

Cultivation, logging, and natural disasters have all put pressure on North Korea's forests. During the economic crisis of the 1990s, deforestation accelerated, as people turned to the woodlands to provide firewood and food. This in turn has led to soil erosion, soil depletion, and increased risk of flooding. In response, the government has promoted a tree planting program. Based on satellite imagery, it was estimated in 2013 that 40% of forest cover had been lost since 1985. A forest restoration policy was adopted in 2012.

Boundaries, coastline, and islands

North Korea has an area of 120,538 km², of which 120,408 km² is land and 130 km² is water.

The Korean Peninsula extends about  southward from the northeast Asian continental landmass. Some 3579 islands lie adjacent to the Korean Peninsula, mostly along the south and west coasts.

The southern stretch of its east coast forms the northern side of the East Korea Bay. At the headland Musu Dan, this ends and the coast turns sharply northward.

A recent global remote sensing analysis suggested that there were 1,483km² of tidal flats in North Korea, making it the 21st ranked country in terms of tidal flat area.

Maritime claims
The North Korean government claims territorial waters extending  from shore. It also claims an exclusive economic zone  from shore.

Waters of the Yellow Sea are demarcated between North Korea and South Korea by the disputed Northern Limit Line drawn by the United Nations Command in early 1950s and not officially recognized by North Korea. Disputes between North and South Korean naval vessels have occurred in this area. A total of five disputes were noteworthy enough to have been reported in the news (three in 2009 and two in 2010).

Resources and land use
Natural resources include coal, petroleum, lead, tungsten, zinc, graphite, magnesite, iron ore, copper, gold, pyrites, salt, fluorspar and hydropower.

Land use

Irrigated land
14,600 km² (2003)

Total renewable water resources
778.15 km3 (2011)

Freshwater withdrawal (domestic/industrial/agricultural)
total: 8.66 km3/yr (10%/13%/76%)
per capita: 360.6 m3/yr (2005)

See also

 Administrative divisions of North Korea
 Geography of South Korea
 North Korea Uncovered

Lists:
 List of cities in North Korea
 List of islands of North Korea
 List of lakes in Korea
 List of national parks of Korea
 List of rivers of Korea
 List of mountains in Korea

References

Works cited

Further reading
Dormels, Rainer. North Korea's Cities: Industrial facilities, internal structures and typification. Jimoondang, 2014.

External links

North Korea Uncovered, (North Korea Google Earth), a comprehensive mapping of North Korea on Google Earth

 

bn:উত্তর কোরিয়া#ভূগোল